The Philippine Revolutionary Army, later renamed Philippine Republican Army (Spanish: Ejército Revolucionario Filipino; Tagalog: Panghimagsikang Hukbong Katihan ng Pilipinas), was the official armed forces of the First Philippine Republic from its formation in March of 1897 to its dissolution in November of 1899 in favor of guerilla operations in the Philippine–American War.

History

The revolutionary army used the 1896 edition of the Spanish regular army's Ordenanza del Ejército to organize its forces and establish its character as a modern army. Rules and regulations were laid down for the reorganization of the army, along with the regulation of ranks and the adoption of new fighting methods, new rank insignias, and a new standard uniform known as the rayadillo. Filipino artist Juan Luna is credited with this design. Juan Luna also designed the collar insignia for the uniforms, distinguishing between the services: infantry, cavalry, artillery, sappers, and medics. His brother, General Antonio Luna commissioned him with the task and personally paid for the new uniforms. At least one researcher has postulated that Juan Luna may have patterned the tunic after the English Norfolk jacket, since the Filipino version is not a copy of any Spanish-pattern uniform. Infantry officers wore blue pants with a black stripe down the side, while Cavalry officers wore red trousers with black stripes. Soldiers and junior officers wore straw hats while senior officers often wore peaked caps.

Orders and circulars were issued covering matters such as building trenches and fortifications, equipping every male aged 15 to 50 with bows and arrows (as well as bolo knives, though officers wielded European swords), enticing Filipino soldiers in the Spanish army to defect, collecting empty cartridges for refilling, prohibiting unplanned sorties, inventories of captured arms and ammunition, fundraising, purchasing of arms and supplies abroad, unification of military commands, and exhorting the rich to give aid to the soldiers.

Aguinaldo, a month after he declared Philippine independence, created a pay scale for officers in the army: Following the board, a brigadier general would receive 600 pesos annually, and a sergeant 72 pesos.

When the Philippine–American War erupted on February 4, 1899, the Filipino army suffered heavy losses on every sector. Even Antonio Luna urged Apolinario Mabini, Aguinaldo's chief adviser, to convince the President that guerrilla warfare must be announced as early as April 1899. Aguinaldo adopted guerilla tactics on November 13, 1899, dissolving what remained of the regular army and after many of his crack units were decimated in set-piece battles.

Arsenal
The Filipinos were short on modern weapons. Most of its weapons were captured from the Spanish, were improvised or were traditional weapons. The service rifles of the nascent army were the Spanish M93 and the Spanish Remington Rolling Block rifle. Moreover, while in Hong Kong, Emilio Aguinaldo purchased rifles from the Americans. Two batches of 2,000 rifles each including ammunition were ordered and paid for. The first batch arrived while the second batch never did. In his letters to Galicano Apacible, Mariano Ponce also sought weapons from both domestic and international dealers in the Empire of Japan. He was offered different breech-loading single-shot rifles since most nations were discarding them in favor of new smokeless bolt-action rifles. However, there was no mention of any purchase occurring. Another planned purchase was the Murata rifle from Japan but no record exists that it made its way into the hands of Filipino revolutionaries.

Crew-served weapons of the Philippine military included captured Spanish guns such as Krupp guns, Ordóñez guns, and Maxim-Nordenfelt multi-barreled guns. There were also improvised artillery weapons made of water pipes reinforced with bamboo or timber known as lantakas, which can only fire once or twice.

Ranks

The evolution of Philippine revolutionary insignia can be divided into three basic periods; early Katipunan, late Katipunan and the Republican army.

Revolutionary Army enlisted ranks

Branch colors
In 1898, the Philippine government prescribed branch colors twice:

Branch insignia
Engineers:  A castle superimposed on a diagonally crossed pickax and shovel, surmounted by a sun.
General staff:  A five-pointed star within a wreath surmounted by a sun.
Artillery: Crossed field guns above six cannonballs, surmounted by a sun.
Infantry:  A diagonally crossed dagger and bolo surmounted by a sun, superimposed on three concentric circles.
Cavalry:  Two crossed lances over two crossed sabers, surmounted by a sun.
Light Infantry/Rifle battalions:  Two crossed rifles with fixed bayonets surmounted by a sun, superimposed on three concentric circles.
Intendancy-Quartermaster:  A cockade within a wreath surmounted by a sun.
Signals:  Six lightning bolts over a semicircular wreath surmounted by a sun.
Medical Service:  A  bowl of Hygieia within a wreath surmounted by a sun.

Recruitment and conscription
During the revolution against Spain, the Katipunan gave leaflets to the people to encourage them to join the revolution. Since the revolutionaries had become regular soldiers at the time of Emilio Aguinaldo, they started to recruit males and some females aged 15 and above as a form of national service. A few Spanish and Filipino enlisted personnel and officers of the Spanish Army and Spanish Navy defected to the Revolutionary Army, as well as a number of foreign individuals and American defectors who volunteered to join during the course of the revolution.

Conscription in the revolutionary army was in effect in the Philippines and military service was mandatory at that time by the order of Gen. Antonio Luna, the Chief Commander of the Army during the Philippine–American War.

Philippine Revolutionary Navy
The Philippine Revolutionary Navy was established during the second phase of the Philippine Revolution when General Emilio Aguinaldo formed the Revolutionary Navy. On May 1, 1898, the first ship handed by Admiral George Dewey to the Revolutionary Navy is a small pinnace from the Reina Cristina of Admiral Patricio Montojo, which was named Magdalo. The Navy was initially composed of a small fleet of eight Spanish steam launches captured from the Spaniards. The ships were refitted with 9-centimeter guns. The rich, namely Leon Apacible, Manuel Lopez and Gliceria Marella de Villavicencio, later donated five other vessels of greater tonnage, the Taaleño, the Balayan, the Bulusan, the Taal and the Purísima Concepción. The 900-ton inter-island tobacco steamer further reinforced the fleet, Compania de Filipinas (renamed as the navy flagship Filipinas), steam launches purchased from China and other watercraft donated by wealthy patriots.

Naval stations were later established to serve as ships' home bases in the following:
Ports of Aparri
Ports of Legaspi
Ports of Balayan
Ports of Calapan
Ports of San Roque, Cavite

On September 26, 1898, Aguinaldo appointed Captain Pascual Ledesma (a merchant ship captain) as Director of the Bureau of the Navy, assisted by Captain Angel Pabie (another merchant ship captain). After passing of the Malolos Constitution the Navy was transferred from the Ministry of Foreign Relations to the Department of War (thereafter known as the Department of War and the Navy) headed by Gen. Mariano Trías.

As the tensions between Filipinos and Americans erupted in 1899 and a continued blockade on naval forces by the Americans, the Philippine naval forces started to be decimated.

Flags and early banners of the revolution

General officers
During the existence of the Revolutionary Army, over 100 individuals were appointed to General Officer grades. For details, see the List of Filipino generals in the Philippine Revolution and the Philippine–American War article.

Other notable officers

 General Águeda Kahabagan y Iniquinto - Commander of the Reserve Corps from April 6, 1899. The only female General in the roster.
 Colonel Agapito Bonzón
 Colonel Felipe Salvador – Commander of the Santa Iglesia faction.
 Colonel Apolinar Vélez
 Colonel Alejandro Avecilla
 Colonel Francisco "Paco" Román – Aide to Lieutenant General Antonio Luna.
 Colonel Manuel Bernal – Aide to Lieutenant General Antonio Luna.
 Colonel Pablo Tecson – Leader, Battle of Quingua.
 Colonel Alipio Tecson – Supreme Military Commander of Tarlac in 1900 and exiled to Guam. 
 Colonel Simón Tecson – Leader of Siege of Baler; signatory of the Biak-na-Bato Constitution.
 Colonel Simeón Villa
 Colonel Luciano San Miguel
 Colonel Joaquin Luna
 Colonel José Tagle –  Known for his role in the Battle of Imus.
 Lieutenant Colonel Lázaro Macapagal – Commanding officer in-charge at the execution of Andrés and Procopio Bonifacio brothers.
 Lieutenant Colonel José Torres Bugallón – Hero of the Battle of La Loma.
 Lieutenant Colonel Regino Díaz Relova – Fought as one of the heads of columns under General Juan Cailles in the Laguna province.
 Major Manuel Quezon – Aide to President Emilio Aguinaldo. Eventually succeeded him as the second president of the Philippines under the United States-sponsored Commonwealth.
 Major Eugenio Daza – Area Commander Southeastern Samar and overall Commander and chief organizer of the Balangiga Encounter.
 Major Juan Arce
 Captain José Bernal – Aide to Lieutenant General Antonio Luna.
 Captain Eduardo Rusca – Aide to Lieutenant General Antonio Luna.
 Captain Pedro Janolino – Commanding Officer of the Kawit Battalion.
 Captain Vicente Roa
 Captain Serapio Narváez – Officer of the 4th Company, Morong Battalion.
 Captain Cirilo Arenas - Captain of Maguagui (Naic), Cavite.
 Lieutenant García – one of Gen. Luna's favorite sharpshooters of the Black Guard units.
 Corporal Anastacio Félix – 4th Company, Morong Battalion the first Filipino casualty of the Philippine–American War.

Notable officers and servicemen and their ethnic background

Army

 General Juan Cailles – Franco-Indian mestizo who led Filipino forces in Laguna
 General José Valesy Nazaraire – Spanish.
 Brigadier General José Ignacio Paua – Full-blooded Chinese general in the Army.
 Brigadier General B. Natividad – Brigade Acting Commander in Vigan under General Tinio.
 Colonel Manuel Sityar – Half-Spanish Director of Academía Militar de Malolos. A former captain in the Spanish colonial army who defected to the Filipino side.
 Colonel Sebastian de Castro – Spanish director of the military hospital at Malasiqui, Pangasinan.
 Colonel Dámaso Ybarra y Thomas – Spanish.
 Lieutenant Colonel Potenciano Andrade – Spanish.
 Estaquio Castellor – French mestizo who led a battalion of sharpshooters.
 Major Candido Reyes – Instructor at the Academía Militar de Malolos. Former sergeant in the Spanish Army.
 Major José Reyes – Instructor at the Academía Militar de Malolos. Former sergeant in the Spanish Army.
 Major José Torres Bugallón – Spanish officer who served under General Luna.
 Captain Antonio Costosa – Former officer in the Spanish Army.
 Captain Tei Hara – Japanese officer who fought in the Philippine-American war with volunteer soldiers.
 Captain Chizuno Iwamoto – Japanese officer who served on Emilio Aguinaldo's staff. Returned to Japan after Aguinaldo's capture.
 A Japanese national named Tobira ("Tomvilla" in American records) who was adjutant to General Licerio Geronimo.
 Captain David Fagen – An African-American Captain who served under Brigadier General Urbano Lacuna. A former Corporal in United States Army 24th Colored Regiment.
 Captain Francisco Espina – Spanish.
 Captain Estanislao de los Reyes – Spanish aide-de-camp to General Tinio.
 Captain Feliciano Ramoso – Spanish aide-de-camp to General Tinio.
 Captain Mariano Queri – Spanish officer who served under General Luna as an instructor in the Academía Militar de Malolos and later as the director-general of the staff of the war department.
 Captain Camillo Ricchiardi – Italian.
 Captain Telesforo Centeno – Spanish.
 Captain Arthur Howard – American deserter from the 1st California Volunteers.
 Captain Glen Morgan – American who organized insurgent forces in central Mindanao.
 Captain John Miller – American who organized insurgent forces in central Mindanao.
 Captain Russel – American deserter from the 10th Infantry.
 Lieutenant Danfort – American deserter from the 10th Infantry.
 Lieutenant Maximino Lazo – Spanish.
 Lieutenant Gabriel Badelly Méndez – Cuban.
 2nd Lieutenant Segundo Paz – Spanish.
 Lieutenant Alejandro Quirulgico – Spanish.
 Lieutenant Rafael Madina – Spanish.
 Lieutenant Saburo Nakamori – Japanese.
 Lieutenant Arsenio Romero – Spanish.
 Private John Allane – United States Army.
 Private Harry Dennis – United States Army.
 Private William Hyer – United States Army.
 Private Meeks (given name not specified) – United States Army.
 Private George Raymond – 41st Infantry, United States Army.
 Private Maurice Sibley – 16th Infantry, United States Army.
 Private John Wagner – United States Army.
 Private Edward Walpole – United States Army.
 Henry Richter – American deserter from the 9th Cavalry.
 Gorth Shores – American deserter from the 9th Cavalry.
 Fred Hunter – American deserter from the 9th Cavalry.
 William Denten – American deserter who joined General Lukban in Samar.
 Enrique Warren – American deserter who served under Francisco Makabulos in Tarlac.
 Frank Mekin - American deserter from the 37th Infantry who served as a lieutenant under General Juan Cailles.
 Earl Guenther - American deserter and canteen keeper from the 37th Infantry at the Paete garrison who served under General Juan Cailles.
 Antonio Prisco – Spanish.
 Manuel Alberto – Spanish.
 Eugenia Plona – Spanish aide-de-camp to Baldermo Aguinaldo.
 Alexander MacIntosh – English.
 William McAllister – English.
 Charles MacKinley – Englishman who served in Laoag.
 James O'Brian – English.

Navy
 Captain Simplicio Agoncillo Orosa - Captain of the first steam flagship of the navy, SS Bulusan.
 Captain Vicente Catalan – Captain of the Philippine Navy ship Filipinas. A Criollo from Cuba and a former member of the Spanish Navy. Admiral of the Philippine Navy.

See also

 Military history of the Philippines
 Katipunan
 Luna Sharpshooters
 Armed Forces of the Philippines
 Philippine Army
 History of the Philippine Army

References

Bibliography

In popular media 
The Philippine revolutionary army has been mentioned in several books and films.

Books

Films 
 Teniente Rosario (1937) 
 Dugo sa Kapirasong Lupa (1975)
 Ganito Kami Noon, Paano Kayo Ngayon? (1976)
 Aguila (1980)
 Tirad Pass: The Last Stand of Gen. Gregorio del Pilar (1996)
 José Rizal (1998)
 Baler (2008)
 Amigo (2010)
 El Presidente (2012)
 Bonifacio: Ang Unang Pangulo (2014)
 Heneral Luna (2015) 
 Goyo: Ang Batang Heneral'' (2018)

External links 
 Philippines Independence Armies: Insignia 1896 – 1902
 
 Images of Filipino Republican Army rayadillo tunics

Military of the Philippines
Philippine Revolution
Military history of the Philippines
Disbanded armies
Rebel groups in the Philippines